The 1905 University of New Mexico football team was an American football team represented the University of New Mexico as an independent during the 1905 college football season. In its first season under head coach Martin F. Angell, the team compiled a 5–1–1 record and outscored opponents by a total of 90 to 45. Wales A. Smith was the team captain.  Coach Angell was a professor of physics and mathematics.

Schedule

Roster
The roster of the 1905 University of Mexico football team included the following players:

 Walter Allen, right halfback
 Hugh Bryan, right end and left end
 Albert Clancy, quarterback, left end, and right end
 Bernard Crawford, captain, left tackle, right tackle, right end, and left guard
 Tom Danahy, fullback and right tackle
 Gibson, center 
 Kenneth Heald, right tackle and fullback
 Mike Maguire, left tackle
 Martin, quarterback
 Joseph Mayo, left end, right end, and left halfback
 Edmund Ross, right guard
 Lawrence Selva, center 
 Wales Smith, captain, left halfback, and left guard
 Trimble Wells, left guard and right guard
Sources:

References

University of New Mexico
New Mexico Lobos football seasons
University of New Mexico football